Gordon Henry (9 October 1930 – 23 December 2007) was a Scottish professional footballer who made over 170 appearances as a centre half in the Football League for Aldershot.

References

1930 births
Scottish footballers
Scottish Football League players
Annbank United F.C. players
Association football wing halves
Aberdeen F.C. players
St Mirren F.C. players
Aldershot F.C. players
Salisbury City F.C. players
Western Football League players
2007 deaths